Artemisia maritima is a European species of wormwood known as sea wormwood and old woman. It is native to France, the United Kingdom, Italy, Belgium, Germany, Denmark, Sweden, Bulgaria and Russia.

In its many variations of form it has an extremely wide distribution in the northern hemisphere of the Old World, occurring mostly in saltish soils. It is found in the salt marshes of the British Isles, on the coasts of the Baltic, of France and the Mediterranean, and on saline soils in Hungary; thence it extends eastwards, covering immense tracts in Southern Russia, the region of the Caspian Sea and Central Siberia to Chinese Mongolia. In Britain it is found as far as Wigton on the West and Aberdeen on the East; also in north-east Ireland and in the Channel Islands. It can be also found in Italy, on the Northern Adriatic coast.

Artemisia maritima is a deciduous shrub growing to 0.6 m (2 ft). It iflowers from August to September. The flowers and are pollinated by Wind.

The plant somewhat resembles Artemisia absinthium, the absinthe wormwood, but is smaller. The stems rise about a foot or 18 inches in height. The leaves are twice pinnatifid, with narrow, linear segments, and, like the whole plant, are covered on both sides with a coat of white cottony fibers. The small, oblong flower heads, each containing three to six tubular florets, are of a yellowish or brownish tint; they are produced in August and September, and are arranged in racemes, sometimes drooping, sometimes erect.

Popularly this species is called Old Woman, in distinction to Old Man or southernwood, Artemisia abrotanum, which it somewhat resembles, though it is more delicate-looking and lacks the peculiar refreshing scent of 'Old Man.' Dr. Hill says of this species: "This is a very noble bitter: its peculiar province is to give an appetite, as that of the Common Wormwood is to assist digestion; the flowery tops and the young shoots possess the virtue: the older Leaves and the Stalk should be thrown away as useless .... The apothecaries put three times as much sugar as of the ingredient in their Conserves; but the virtue is lost in the sweetness, those will not keep so well that have less sugar, but 'tis easy to make them fresh as they are wanted."

The plant abounds in salt marshes in which cattle have been observed to fatten quickly, and thus the herb has acquired the reputation of being beneficial to them, but they do not eat it generally, and the richness of maritime pasturage must be regarded as the true reason of their improvement under such circumstances. This plant is the botanical symbol of Saint Ninian. It is known locally around Whithorn in southwest Scotland as apple-ringy due to its scent.

The flowering tops and young shoots are used, collected and dried in the same manner as Wormwood. The plant possesses the same properties as the other Wormwoods but is less powerful. It is a bitter tonic and aromatic. Although it is not now employed in regular medical practice, it is often made use of by country people for intermittent fever, and for various other medicinal purposes instead of the true Wormwood.

The plant is a source of the sesquiterpenoid santonin.

Thornton, in his Family Herbal, tells us that "'beat up with thrice its weight of fine sugar, it is made up into a conserve ordered by the London College, and may be taken where the other preparations disgust too much."

It acts as a tonic and is good in worm cases, and the seventeenth century botanist Nicholas Culpeper gives the following uses for it: "Boiling water poured upon it produces an excellent stomachic infusion, but the best way is taking it in a tincture made with brandy. Hysteric complaints have been completely cured by the constant use of this tincture. In the scurvy and in the hypo-chondriacal disorders of studious, sedentary men, few things have a greater effect: for these it is best in strong infusion. The whole blood and all the juices of the body are affected by taking this herb. It is often used in medicine instead of the Roman Wormwood, though it falls far short of it in virtue."

References

External links
Plants for a Future
Natural Medicinal Herbs
Henriette's Herbal Homepage

maritima
Medicinal plants of Asia
Medicinal plants of Europe
Plants described in 1753
Taxa named by Carl Linnaeus